Bastia is a genus of harvestmen in the family Sclerosomatidae from South and Southeast Asia.

Species
 Bastia lineata Roewer, 1910
 Bastia elegans Suzuki, 1977
 Bastia guttata Banks, 1930

References

Sclerosomatidae
Harvestman genera